is a concert hall in Fukushima city, Fukushima Prefecture, Japan. It opened in 1984 and has a shoebox-style auditorium with 1,000 seats and a smaller hall with a capacity of 200. Okada & Associates were the architects, with acoustical design by Nagata Acoustics. The 41 stop organ is by Marcussen.

References

External links
 Homepage

Concert halls in Japan
Buildings and structures in Fukushima Prefecture
Tourist attractions in Fukushima Prefecture
Fukushima (city)
Music venues completed in 1984
1984 establishments in Japan